Marco Fassinotti (born 29 April 1989 in Turin) is an Italian high jumper.

Biography
He has a record of 2.29 m, obtained in Paris on 5 March 2011. He was a finalist (7th) at the World Junior Championships in Athletics in Bydgoszcz on 13 July 2008. After entering the sports group of Centro Sportivo Aeronautica Militare, he took part in the first European Championships in Barcelona 2010, reaching 9th place with 2.23 m. At the European indoor games of Paris in 2011, Fassinotti finished 6th, obtaining his personal best of 2.29 m. He trains at the Club Primo Nebiolo of Turin with the company SAFA.

National records
 High jump indoor: 2.34 ( Ancona, 23 February 2014)

Achievements

1No mark in the final

National titles
Fassinotti won five national championships at individual senior level.

Italian Athletics Championships
High jump: 2013, 2015, 2021 (3)
Italian Athletics Indoor Championships
High jump: 2014, 2020 (2)

See also
 Italian records in athletics
 Men's high jump Italian record progression
 Italian all-time top lists - High jump
 Italy at the 2010 European Athletics Championships

References

External links
 

1989 births
Living people
Italian male high jumpers
Sportspeople from Turin
Athletics competitors of Centro Sportivo Aeronautica Militare
Athletes (track and field) at the 2016 Summer Olympics
Olympic athletes of Italy
World Athletics Championships athletes for Italy
Universiade medalists in athletics (track and field)
Athletes (track and field) at the 2018 Mediterranean Games
Mediterranean Games bronze medalists for Italy
Mediterranean Games medalists in athletics
Universiade silver medalists for Italy
Competitors at the 2011 Summer Universiade
Competitors at the 2009 Summer Universiade
Medalists at the 2017 Summer Universiade
Athletes (track and field) at the 2022 Mediterranean Games
20th-century Italian people
21st-century Italian people